"Empty" is a song by American power pop band the Click Five. It was released as the third single for Thailand and the Philippines and the second single for Singapore and Malaysia taken from their second studio album Modern Minds and Pastimes.

Background
Songwriter/keyboardist Ben Romans told Songfacts: "This is a song that actually came right before the record. And I remember it was one of those weird melody things. I have a studio in Boston and I kept hearing this melody, and I had to pull over when I was singing in the car. But fortunately I didn't forget it."

Chart performance

References

External links
The Click Five official website
Music video of "Empty"

2007 singles
The Click Five songs
Songs written by Ben Romans
2007 songs
Lava Records singles